Westmere is a locality in south-west Victoria, Australia, in the Rural City of Ararat local government area,  west of the state capital, Melbourne.

References

External links

Towns in Victoria (Australia)